Nguyễn Minh Tú (born 14 November 1991 in Ho Chi Minh City) is a Vietnamese supermodel, beauty queen, and an actress. She won the silver prize in Supermodel Vietnam 2013, and was runner up in the fifth season of Asia's Next Top Model. She was one of three mentors of The Face Vietnam 2017, as well as a mentor for season six of Asia's Next Top Model.  In 2018, she was appointed as Miss Supranational Vietnam 2018 and represented Vietnam at Miss Supranational 2018, where she finished in the top ten, and in Miss Supranational Asia 2018.

Vietnam Supermodel 2013
Tú won silver prize along with Trần Minh Trung and Phan Hà Phương. Trần Ngọc Lan Khuê won the competition.

Asia's Next Top Model
In 2017, Tú represented Vietnam in the fifth season of Asia's Next Top Model. During the competition, she earned a total of 2 first call-outs, 4-second call-outs and made it to the final without any appearances in the show's bottom two. She was placed as a runner-up alongside Malaysian contestant Shikin Gomez. Filipino contestant Maureen Wroblewitz won the competition.

The Face Vietnam
After her run on Asia's Next Top Model, Tú became a mentor on the second season of The Face Vietnam.

Miss Supranational Vietnam 2018
She was appointed title as Vietnam's presenter in Miss Supranational 2018. (Ngoc Chau crowned Miss Supranational Vietnam 2018, and she represented Vietnam at MS 2019)

Miss supranational 2018
Minh Tu represented Vietnam at the 2018 edition of Miss Supranational where she earned a spot in the Top 10 during a live show. Tu placed 7th overall as announced through the official Instagram page of Miss Supranational. Valeria Vasquez of Puerto Rico won the pageant. She also won the title of Miss supranational Asia in a backstage event.

Personal life 

Beginning in 2018, Minh Tú was dating rapper Andree. In August 2019, the couple separated.

References 

1992 births
Living people
Top Model finalists
Vietnamese female models
People from Ho Chi Minh City
Miss Supranational contestants
21st-century Vietnamese women